The powerlifting events at the 2005 World Games in Duisburg was played between 16 and 17 July. 67 athletes, from 24 nations, participated in the tournament. The powerlifting competition took place in Rheinhausenhalle.

Participating nations

Medal table

Events

Men's events

Women's events

References

External links
 International Powerlifting Federation
 Powerlifting on IWGA website
 Results

 
2005 World Games
2005